Teres muscle may refer to:

 Pronator teres muscle
 Teres major muscle
 Teres minor muscle